Serena B. Miller (born January 20, 1950) is an American author of inspirational fiction, historical fiction and Amish fiction.

Early life and education
Miller was born in Portsmouth, Ohio and grew up in southern Ohio. Much of her childhood was spent in an 1840s log house originally belonging to her great-grandfather. She attended Ohio Valley Christian College in Parkersburg, West Virginia.

Writing career
Miller began to seriously pursue a writing career in her late forties after her sons were grown. She was first publishing in various periodicals including The Detroit Free Press Magazine, Billy Graham's Decision Magazine, Guideposts, Focus On The Family, Christian Woman, Woman's World, and Reader's Digest. After joining Romance Writers of America in 2001, she began submitting full-length inspirational novels to various publishers.

Her fascination with an Old Order Amish settlement that had recently moved into southern Ohio near her home resulted in Love Finds You in Sugarcreek, Ohio (2010). Closely following were three more Amish novels: An Uncommon Grace (2012), Hidden Mercies (2013), and Fearless Hope (2014).  
Her interest in the post-civil war lumbering era in Michigan inspired a historical series beginning with The Measure of Katie Calloway (2010) followed by A Promise to Love (2011) and Under A Blackberry Moon (2013).

She is working with co-author Paul Stutzman on a non-fiction book entitled The Wisdom of Amish Parenting.

Personal life
After several years working as a court reporter in Detroit, Michigan, she and her husband moved back to their hometown of Minford, Ohio where he is the minister of the Sunshine Church of Christ. They are the parents of three grown sons, Derek, Caleb, and Jacob Miller.

Bibliography

Filmography

References

External links

 Official Serena B. Miller US web site
 

21st-century American novelists
RITA Award winners
American romantic fiction writers
1950 births
Living people
American women novelists
21st-century American women writers
Women romantic fiction writers
People from Portsmouth, Ohio